Archibald Hynd (Archie) Johnstone (June 12, 1924 – November 8, 2014) was a Canadian businessman and retired Senator.

Born in Burlington, Prince Edward Island, he was a crew member with the Royal Canadian Air Force heavy bombing squadron during World War II.

He worked with his father to develop Woodleigh Replicas in Burlington and was president of the Prince Edward Island Federation of Agriculture and director of the Island Tourism Association.

In March 1998, he was summoned to the Senate on the recommendation of Jean Chrétien and represented the senatorial division of Prince Edward Island. He served, as a Liberal, barely a year until his retirement on his 75th in 1999.

See also
 Johnstone (surname)

References

External links
 Debates of the Senate,  Volume 137, Issue 143
 

1924 births
2014 deaths
Canadian military personnel of World War II
People from Prince County, Prince Edward Island
Canadian senators from Prince Edward Island
Liberal Party of Canada senators